The Oosthoek is a Dutch encyclopedia, published by Oosthoek's Uitgevers Mij. N.V. in Utrecht, which was founded in 1907 by A. Oosthoek (1876–1949) and which merged with Kluwer in 1970. The encyclopedia is a continuation of Vivat's Geïllustreerde Encyclopedie (11 vols., Amsterdam, 1899–1908), bought by Oosthoek and it appeared from 1916 as Oosthoek's Geïllustreerde Encyclopaedie. The content and illustrations of both Vivat as well as the pre-war editions of Oosthoek are based on the German Meyers Konversations-Lexikon. The 7th and latest edition (1976–81) is titled De Grote Oosthoek.

Editions

Dutch encyclopedias
1916 non-fiction books
20th-century encyclopedias